Difludiazepam (Ro07-4065) is a benzodiazepine derivative which is the 2',6'-difluoro derivative of fludiazepam. It was invented in the 1970s but was never marketed, and has been used as a research tool to help determine the shape and function of the GABAA receptors, at which it has an IC50 of 4.1nM. Difludiazepam has subsequently been sold as a designer drug, and was first notified to the EMCDDA by Swedish authorities in 2017.

See also 
 Diclazepam
 Flubromazepam
 Ro07-5220
 SH-I-048A

References 

Benzodiazepines
Fluoroarenes
GABAA receptor positive allosteric modulators